East Pasadena  is an unincorporated community in Los Angeles County, California, United States. The population was 6,144 at the 2010 census, up from 6,045 at the 2000 census. For statistical purposes, the United States Census Bureau has defined East Pasadena as a census-designated place (CDP).

Geography

The land area of East Pasadena is separated into two non-contiguous segments:
The main portion, bordered by Pasadena city limits on the north, California Boulevard on the south, Michillinda Avenue (Arcadia city limits) on the east, and San Gabriel Boulevard on the west.
A smaller district to the west, bordered by Del Mar Boulevard to the north, San Marino city limits to the south, Berkeley Avenue to the west and San Gabriel Boulevard to the east.

The community has become considerably smaller as the city of Pasadena has expanded its boundaries to include more of the unincorporated area of East Pasadena.

The definition of the area was created by the Census Bureau for statistical purposes and may not precisely correspond to local understanding of the area with the same name.

Demographics

2010
At the 2010 census East Pasadena had a population of 6,144. The racial makeup of East Pasadena was 3,183 (51.8%) White (33.9% Non-Hispanic White), 183 (3.0%) African American, 47 (0.8%) Native American, 1,589 (25.9%) Asian, 7 (0.1%) Pacific Islander, 857 (13.9%) from other races, and 278 (4.5%) from two or more races. Hispanic or Latino of any race were 2,139 persons (34.8%).

The census reported that 6,119 people (99.6% of the population) lived in households, 7 (0.1%) lived in non-institutionalized group quarters, and 18 (0.3%) were institutionalized.

There were 2,096 households, 704 (33.6%) had children under the age of 18 living in them, 1,158 (55.2%) were opposite-sex married couples living together, 241 (11.5%) had a female householder with no husband present, 115 (5.5%) had a male householder with no wife present.  There were 98 (4.7%) unmarried opposite-sex partnerships, and 14 (0.7%) same-sex married couples or partnerships. 441 households (21.0%) were one person and 178 (8.5%) had someone living alone who was 65 or older. The average household size was 2.92.  There were 1,514 families (72.2% of households); the average family size was 3.37.

The age distribution was 1,303 people (21.2%) under the age of 18, 510 people (8.3%) aged 18 to 24, 1,645 people (26.8%) aged 25 to 44, 1,729 people (28.1%) aged 45 to 64, and 957 people (15.6%) who were 65 or older.  The median age was 40.5 years. For every 100 females, there were 97.3 males.  For every 100 females age 18 and over, there were 96.0 males.

There were 2,184 housing units at an average density of 1,651.2 per square mile, of the occupied units 1,435 (68.5%) were owner-occupied and 661 (31.5%) were rented. The homeowner vacancy rate was 1.3%; the rental vacancy rate was 2.4%.  4,286 people (69.8% of the population) lived in owner-occupied housing units and 1,833 people (29.8%) lived in rental housing units.

According to the 2010 United States Census, East Pasadena had a median household income of $71,151, with 16.0% of the population living below the federal poverty line.

2000
At the 2000 census there were 6,045 people, 2,038 households, and 1,502 families in the CDP. The population density was 4,586.6 inhabitants per square mile (1,768.2/km). The racial makeup of the CDP was 55.70% White, 2.55% Black or African American, 0.79% Native American, 20.03% Asian, 0.05% Pacific Islander, 14.43% from other races, and 6.45% from two or more races.  35.24% of the population were Hispanic or Latino of any race.
Of the 2,038 households 34.6% had children under the age of 18 living with them, 58.0% were married couples living together, 10.7% had a female householder with no husband present, and 26.3% were non-families. 21.3% of households were one person and 7.6% were one person aged 65 or older.  The average household size was 2.95 and the average family size was 3.43.

The age distribution was 24.6% under the age of 18, 8.4% from 18 to 24, 29.6% from 25 to 44, 23.8% from 45 to 64, and 13.6% 65 or older.  The median age was 37 years. For every 100 females, there were 94.6 males.  For every 100 females age 18 and over, there were 91.2 males.

The median household income was $53,378 and the median family income  was $61,531. Males had a median income of $50,208 versus $35,104 for females. The per capita income for the CDP was $34,548.  About 6.1% of families and 9.4% of the population were below the poverty line, including 12.6% of those under age 18 and 4.0% of those age 65 or over.

Wildlife
Feral peafowl are common in East Pasadena, Arcadia, San Marino and other west San Gabriel Valley communities. In 2021, the Los Angeles County Board of Supervisors moved to ban the feeding of peafowl due to the increasing population in recent decades. The municipal codes of the cities of Pasadena and Arcadia already prohibit feeding peafowl.

Government

County 
The Los Angeles County Sheriff's Department (LASD) operates the Temple Station in Temple City, serving East Pasadena.

State and federal 
In the state legislature East Pasadena is located in the 25th Senate District, represented by Democrat Anthony Portantino and in the 41st Assembly District, represented by Democrat Chris Holden. Federally, East Pasadena is located in California's California's 27th congressional district and is represented by Democrat Judy Chu.

Education
East Pasadena is served by the San Marino Unified School District serving the southwest portion and Pasadena Unified School District serving the Rosemead Boulevard corridor.

In popular culture
A fictionalized City of "East Pasadena" is depicted in the TV series Law & Order: LA.

References

Communities in the San Gabriel Valley
Census-designated places in Los Angeles County, California
Census-designated places in California